Udny Parish Church is a congregation of the Church of Scotland at Udny Green, Aberdeenshire in the north-east of Scotland, some 15 miles north of Aberdeen. Formerly known as Christ's Kirk, it was designed by the City of Aberdeen architect John Smith in 1821. Sited on the north edge of the village green, it is within the ancient Udny Parish and the Formartine committee area. It is a Category B listed building.

Architecture
Constructed from granite in 1821 to the plans of the City of Aberdeen architect, John Smith, this was the first of his ecclesiastical designs to utilise a Tudor-Gothic style. The southern elevation has a four-stage tower with an arched entrance with a hood mould and a curved window above. The tower protrudes from the main rectangular body of the church, which forms symmetrical gables to either side and features elongated arched windows. A broad slated roof tops the main part of the structure and it has pinnacles on the four outside corners. Similar spires are in each corner of the tower above a crenellated parapet.

A clock face is set at the top of the south facing side of the tower. It bears a dated stone, 1895, but it is uncertain whether this date applies to the clock itself or if the final stage of the tower was added in that year. The inscribed bell was made by Thomas Mears II.

The single-storey harled session house and vestry are sited on the opposite side at the rear elevation of the church. Four plain-glass windows are installed on the west and east elevations. Access is also available on the east side through a side door.

In 1890 Alexander Marshall Mackenzie undertook internal restoration work and the roof was replaced.
Harrison & Harrison made the pipe organ, which is positioned to the rear of the pulpit. It is of the manual action type. Stained glass panels were placed in the existing three mullioned window on the north gable in 1927.

As there is no burial ground attached to the church, burials take place at the nearby Old Church yard instead.

References
Citations

Bibliography

Churches completed in 1821
Church of Scotland churches in Scotland
Churches in Aberdeenshire
Category B listed buildings in Aberdeenshire